USS Crane (DD-109) was a  in the United States Navy. She is named for naval officer William M. Crane.

Crane was launched on 4 July 1918 by Bethlehem Shipbuilding Corporation, Union Iron Works, San Francisco, California; sponsored by Mrs. M. McGuire; and commissioned on 18 April 1919, Lieutenant Commander W. F. Gresham in command.

Service history
Clearing San Francisco 21 April 1919, Crane arrived at Newport, Rhode Island, 13 May. She sailed for duty in European waters on 5 June, visiting ports in England and France and joining the escort for  carrying President Woodrow Wilson to the peace conference. Returning to New York on 27 July, Crane was assigned to the Pacific Fleet, and arrived at San Francisco on 1 September. Here she participated in the naval review, during which she was visited by Secretary of the Navy Josephus Daniels on 4 September. After operations off the coast of Washington, Crane was placed in reserve at San Diego 26 January 1920, participating in occasional maneuvers until decommissioned on 7 June 1922, at San Diego.

Recommissioned on 18 December 1939, Crane joined the Neutrality Patrol in the Pacific Ocean. She continued patrols and provided training for naval reservists and armed guard crews until the outbreak of World War II.

World War II
Crane remained on the west coast on anti-submarine patrol, local escort duty, training exercises, and screening duty for amphibious exercises until 22 April 1944, when she was assigned to the West Coast Sound Training School. After the war she departed San Diego on 2 October 1945, arrived at Philadelphia on 19 October; was decommissioned on 14 November 1945; and sold on 1 November 1946.

References

External links
 NHC – Photos
 NavSource DD-109
 

Wickes-class destroyers
World War II destroyers of the United States
Ships built in San Francisco
1918 ships